The Divine Word College of Vigan also referred to by its acronym DWCV is a private, Catholic, co-educational institution of higher learning run by the Philippine Northern Province of the Society of the Divine Word in Vigan, Ilocos Sur, Philippines. It was founded in 1822 by the society as the Colegio de la Inmaculada Concepción. The current president is Rev. Fr. Edsel R. Demillo, SVD, PhD.

See also
Divine Word Academy of Dagupan – Rizal Ext., Dagupan, Pangasinan
Divine Word College of Bangued – Bangued, Abra
Divine Word College of Calapan – Calapan, Oriental Mindoro
Divine Word College of Laoag – Gen. Segundo Ave., Laoag, Ilocos Norte
Divine Word College of Legazpi – Rizal Street, Legazpi, Albay
Divine Word College of San Jose – San Jose, Occidental Mindoro
Divine Word College of Urdaneta – Urdaneta, Pangasinan
Divine Word University (DWU) – Tacloban, Leyte; closed in 1995, re-opened as Liceo del Verbo Divino

References

External links
 The Immaculate's Official Website

Catholic universities and colleges in the Philippines
Universities and colleges in Ilocos Sur
Education in Vigan
Divine Word Missionaries Order